Malla may refer to:

Places
Bolivia
Malla, Bolivia, a locality
Malla Jawira, a river 
Malla Jaqhi, a mountain 
Malla Municipality 
Malla Qullu, a mountain 

India
 Mallapuram, Tamil Nadu
Malla (tribe), an ancient republic, one of the sixteen Mahajanapadas
Malla Bedian, a village 
Mallabhum, a former kingdom in West Bengal
Malla Reddy Institute of Medical Sciences near Hyderabad
Malla Reddy Engineering College near Hyderabad
Nepal
Malla (Nepal), dynasty who ruled the Kathmandu valley
Khasa Malla kingdom, Kingdom of Khas people of Nepal
List of Malla Kings of Nepal
Other
Malla (Crete), a town of ancient Crete, Greece
Malla, Barcelona, a municipality in Catalonia
Malla, Estonia, a village in Estonia
Malla, Pakistan, a village
Malla Strict Nature Reserve in Lapland, Finland
Vilcún La Malla Airport in Chile

Other
Malla (given name)
Malla (surname)
Mallas – people who practice Malla-yuddha, Indian wrestling
Malla (film), a 2004 Kannada film
Kalla Malla Sulla, a 2011 Kannada film

See also
 Mala (disambiguation)